Antony and Cleopatra is a play by William Shakespeare.

Antony and Cleopatra may also refer to:

Film and television
Antony and Cleopatra (1908 film), a film starring Maurice Costello and Florence Lawrence
Antony and Cleopatra (1913 film), a 1913 Italian film starring Amleto Novelli and Gianna Terribili-Gonzales
Antony and Cleopatra (1959 film), an Australian television play
Antony and Cleopatra (1972 film), a film starring Charlton Heston and Hildegarde Neil
Antony and Cleopatra (1974 TV drama), a television version of a Royal Shakespeare Company production starring Richard Johnson and Janet Suzman
Antony and Cleopatra, a 1981 television version produced as part of the BBC Television Shakespeare starring Colin Blakely and Jane Lapotaire

Music
Antony and Cleopatra (musical duo), a British / Australian electronic duo, with musicians Anita Blay and Alexander Burnett

Other
Antony and Cleopatra (opera), a 1966 opera by Samuel Barber

Antony and Cleopatra (novel), a 2007 novel by Colleen McCullough
Antony and Cleopatra, a 2010 history book by Adrian Goldsworthy